Kenneth Ronald "Ken" Melvin (born September 18, 1952) is an American politician, lawyer and jurist.

Career 
Melvin was born in Fayetteville, North Carolina.

He served as a Democratic member of the Virginia House of Delegates from Portsmouth from 1986 to 2009.

On February 24, 2009, Melvin announced he would not run for reelection. On April 7, Governor Tim Kaine appointed Melvin to a circuit court judgeship in Portsmouth, effective May 1, 2009. On May 1, 2009, he retired from the House and became a judge of the Portsmouth Circuit Court.

On March 4, 2016, Melvin was named as the possible successor to Judge Rossie D. Alston Jr. of the Court of Appeals of Virginia if Alston were to be elevated to the Supreme Court of Virginia. The vote to appoint Alston to the Supreme Court of Virginia failed.

Notes

References

External links

Project Vote Smart - Representative Kenneth Ronald 'Ken' Melvin (VA) profile
Follow the Money - Kenneth R. Melvin
2005 2003 2001 1999 campaign contributions
Washington Post - Kenneth R. Melvin local election 2008 profile

1952 births
Living people
Democratic Party members of the Virginia House of Delegates
Colby College alumni
Georgetown University Law Center alumni
Politicians from Portsmouth, Virginia
Virginia circuit court judges